Jotdog (stylized as JotDog) is a Mexican pop band formed in Mexico City in 2009. The group consists of María Barracuda, born Maricela Morales Rodríguez (vocals and lyrics), and Jorge "La Chiquis" Amaro (guitar, bass, keyboards, drums and vocals); formerly Jotdog's sound is indebted to the electronic era but eventually grew to incorporate influences from many genres of popular music. They have maintained a recognisable sound built on melodic instrumentals, highlighted by Amaro's music and Barracuda's expressive vocals. Their lyrics focus on personal themes such as unrequited love.

Their debut album was released in 2009, with 11 songs written by the band members. "Hasta Contar a Mil" was their first single, followed by "Resistir" and "Las Pequeñas Cosas". Jotdog has received nominations for the MTV Video Music Awards Latinoamérica, Premios Oye! and the Latin Grammy Awards.

Background

Band members
Jotdog is a Mexican pop band formed by María Barracuda, Jorge "Chiquis" Amaro, Their music style is defined as melodic pop, "with surreal messages to leave a festive atmosphere, with smart, clear and urban messages." The band members also had recording careers on their own before forming the band. Jorge "Chiquis" Amaro has been a member of the Mexican bands Fobia, Neon, Rostros Ocultos and Kenny y Los Eléctricos, and also a producer, sound engineer and arranger for Natalia Lafourcade, Maná, Ricardo Arjona, Timbiriche, and Víctimas del Doctor Cerebro; María Barracuda had a solo career;. "From the beginning we thought of Mary [Barracuda] and me as members of the band, because since we met we knew we had chemistry working together in the musical field."

Recording process
Amaro and Barracuda got together in 2005 to develop songs for other artists, since they worked on Barracuda's debut album. Their musical style was under the pop wave. On those work sessions they wrote "Lo que digo yo", "El Beso" y "I Love You", which they liked and decide to keep to themselves, to later include it on their debut album. To let people know these songs Amaro and Barracuda started a MySpace account without saying their names, "so they [people] would listen without prejudice." After that, they started playing in bars and invite friends to play along, Ivan Gonzalez of Maná, and Midi of Moenia. The tracks were produced by Amaro and the lyrics wrote by him and Barracuda. The name of the band, as stated by Barracuda, was chosen since they wanted to relate to something that sounded very pop and a hot dog is something that may resemble the pop art of Andy Warhol, which clung an element of general culture and turned it into art, "so we take the hot dog and changed it." About forming Jotdog, Amaro said: "We are doing it because we really needed, for that need to take new partners with whom you fall in love to see them in rehearse and you're not sick of playing with them.

Their eponymous debut album was released in 2009, with 11 songs, including a cover version of "True Colors", originally performed by Cyndi Lauper. About performing the song, Barracuda told: "Is a song I always liked it and was part of the same accident. There were several songs that we had prepared for other artist and we kept the best and develop this project." "Hasta Contar a Mil" was chosen as their first single. followed by "Resistir" and "Las Pequeñas Cosas". Jotdog received a Latin Grammy Award nomination for Best Pop Vocal Album, Duo or Group, while the band was nominated for Best New Artist. While reviewing the nominees for this category, Billboard magazine columnist Leila Cobo declared Jotdog as the early favorite to win, along Alex Cuba, since they were "popular in Mexico and with an alternative following built from years in other bands." Alex Cuba won the award, while fellow Mexican band Camila received the award for Best Pop Vocal Album, Duo or Group.

Second album and collaborations
Barracuda said about the second Jotdog album that they want to keep their electronic style, "but we want to experiment with other genres such as cumbia and what we did with my debut album, since Jotdog is in fact María Barracuda in disguise." Jotdog joined Noel Schajris, León Polar, Natalia Lafourcade, Playa Limbo, Pambo, Amandititita, Ha*Ash, Kany García, Moenia, Nikki Clan, Los Leftlovers, Varana, Elis Paprika, and Smitten in a Tribute album to Spanish band Mecano. The band performed the track "Maquillaje".

Musical style
The Jotdog' musical style has generally been described as pop and synthpop.

Awards and nominations

Discography

 Jotdog (2009)
 Turista del Amor (2011)
 Universos Paralelos (2015)

Singles

References

Mexican pop music groups
Musical groups from Mexico City
Musical groups established in 2009
Mexican electronic musical groups